Beyni (Bejni) - is a village and administrative center of Beyni rural settlement in Dzheyrakhsky District of the Republic of Ingushetia, Russia.

Geography

Beyni is situated northeast from the administrative center of the district - Dzheyrakh village. The closest inhabited localities is Lyazhgi, Olgetti and Guli southeastward, and Armkhi is situated southwestward

History

Beyni was established not later than the 16th century. The village was abandoned after the forced deportation of the entire Ingush population in 1944 and resettled when the deportees were allowed to return in 1957. Beyni has a touristic tent map, and is a starting point for a popular hike trail, and shortest way to Stolovaya Mountain.

Infrastructure

 Beyni municipal elementary school.

References

Rural localities in Ingushetia